The 3000/3100 class are a class of diesel railcars operated by the State Transport Authority and its successors in Adelaide. They were built by Comeng and Clyde Engineering between 1987 and 1996 and are the workhorse of the non-electrified suburban rail network in Adelaide.

History 

In March 1985, the State Transport Authority (STA) awarded a tender for 20 diesel railcars (eight 3000 class units with a cab at each end and twelve 3100 class with a cab at one end only) to Comeng in Dandenong, Victoria. The design was based on the stainless steel shell of the Comeng electric train then in production for Melbourne's Public Transport Corporation, but  longer and with only two doors per side. Because of a contractual requirement to maximise local content, the fit out was conducted at Comeng's Dry Creek facility. The first commenced testing in May 1987, entering service in November 1987. The eight 3000s were built first with the first 3100 class completed in mid-1988. The last entered service in December 1988.

In the original contract, there was an option to order 76 further examples. However Comeng came back to the STA with a significantly higher price, so the work was put out to tender and a contract for 50 awarded to Clyde Engineering in November 1989. Comeng concluded a deal to sell the 3000 class design and tooling. However by the time construction commenced, Comeng had sold its Dandenong plant to ABB who backed away from an agreement to hand over the jigs and tooling, so they were built between 1992 and 1996 by Clyde Engineering's Martin & King factory in Somerton, Victoria. 

All were delivered with unpainted stainless steel offset by blue and orange stripes. In April 2002 the first was repainted by Bluebird Rail Operations in Adelaide Metro's yellow, blue and red. 

Originally they operated on all Adelaide suburban lines, however since the electrification of the Seaford and Flinders lines in 2014, they have been confined to the Belair, Gawler, Grange and Outer Harbor lines. They have on occasions ventured beyond the Adelaide metropolitan area, operating special services to Nuriootpa on the Barossa Valley line and Riverton on the Roseworthy-Peterborough line. These tours stopped in the mid 2000s.

Mechanics 

Only one of the axles per multiple unit are powered, originally with 2 Stromberg Electric Motors, which have now been replaced since the 2018 life extension.

The 3000 class bodies were built by Comeng and feature airbag secondary suspension. All 3000 class railcars are fitted with electro-magnetic track brakes, which are comparatively rare on trains, though they are commonly found on trams. These are operated separately from the normal mechanical and dynamic braking.

Trains are equipped with automatic Scharfenberg couplers which are operated from the driver's cab. Coupling operations are sometimes performed at Adelaide station, requiring an extra staff member to flag the driver as well as to connect the safety chains. This feature allows sets of up to six cars to be formed.

Two headlights are mounted at the top of the car in the centre on driver's cab ends. There are no marker lights at the front; however, there are red marker lights for the rear located on the upper corners. There are metal steps up the side of the car to each door, but they are not used by passengers, however in emergency situations, they may be used to allow passengers to disembark from the train. They are illuminated by lights at night. All cars are air-conditioned.

During May 2020, 50 out of 70 railcars were taken out of service on the Gawler, Belair and Outer Harbor rail lines due to a significant mechanical fault regarding the servicing of the cars. These trains were out of service for 2 weeks whilst servicing on the turbochargers and other defective parts were repaired/replaced, therefore, a decision was made by DPTI to shift all affected train services to a weekend timetable. The Seaford and Flinders lines were not affected due to electrification having been completed on those lines in early 2014. During these critical repairs, the Grange line was closed.

Refurbishment 

In the 2008/09 State Budget, it was announced that five out of six of Adelaide's railway lines were to be electrified commencing with the Noarlunga and Gawler lines. This was to have resulted in 58 of the 3000/3100 class railcars being converted to electric operation with the remaining 12 to be retained as diesels for operation on the Belair line. However with the electrification project scaled back and the additional orders of the 4000 class trains, the conversions were cancelled.

Commencing in April 2018, all 3000/3100 series railcars began a life extension program which included new Mercedes-Benz engines, upgraded bogies, enhanced upholstery and a repaint into the a red and blue livery similar to the 4000 class units. The modernised livery features silver borders around the headlights and tail lights to allow for better illumination throughout light hours.

Starting from May 2021, Adelaide Metro began to gradually refurbish the interior of the 3000/3100 class railcars, commencing with car 3019. The 2021 refurbishment includes:
 brighter lights
 new wheelchair spaces to provide room for two wheelchairs
 new floor materials designed for better graffiti cleaning, removal of existing graffiti, and deep interior cleaning

References

Further reading 
Further information on the 3000 and 3100 series railcar, including several interior photographs

External links 

Diesel multiple units of South Australia
Train-related introductions in 1987
Transport in Adelaide